Sundiver is a 1980 science fiction novel by American writer David Brin. It is the first book of his first Uplift trilogy, followed by  Startide Rising in 1983 and The Uplift War in 1987.

Plot summary

The novel begins with the main character, Jacob Demwa, working at the center for uplift on Earth, while he recovers from a tragedy at the Vanilla Space Needle where he saved the space elevator from destruction but lost his love in the process. An alien friend of Demwa's, Fagin (a Kanten), contacts Demwa and offers him a job. Initially reluctant to return to his previous life as a scientific investigator, Demwa agrees to attend a secret meeting. He learns that there are "ghosts" appearing in the Sun's chromosphere. The ghosts are without precedent in the galactic library.

Demwa agrees to come and investigate the origin and purpose of the sun-ghosts, and  travels to Mercury where the sundiver project is based. With him on Mercury are Helene deSilva, an attractive station commander with whom Jacob develops a relationship over the course of the book; Fagin; Pila Bubbacub, the library representative; his assistant Culla (a Pring); Dr. Dwayne Kepler (the head of the Sundiver expedition); Dr. Mildred Martine (a psychiatrist); and the exuberant journalist Peter LaRoque.

Demwa goes to the sun, and observes the sun-ghosts. There are apparently three forms: the "toroids" which appear to be similar to cattle and live off of the magnetic fields in the chromosphere, a relatively fluid, apparently intelligent variety, and a threatening, strangely anthropomorphic figure that avoids the side of the sunship where the instruments are located. When a neo-chimpanzee scientist, Dr. Jeffrey, is killed on a solo mission to the sun, it seems to confirm the sun-ghosts' hostile intent.  An investigation seems to implicate the reporter, LaRoque. LaRoque is then tested to determine if he is capable of murder. The test results indicate LaRoque has violent tendencies and he is incarcerated.

A third trip to the sun is undertaken, in hopes that Pila Bubbacub will be able to contact the sun-ghosts. It fails to do so, but claims to have succeeded, saying that the sun-ghosts are offended and have used psi to control LaRoque's actions. He uses a powder that blocks the ship's sensors to pretend he has dispelled the sun-ghosts because he is embarrassed by the Library's lack of data on the ghosts. Back on Mercury, Jacob discovers his trick, and reveals it, resulting in disgrace to Bubbacub and embarrassment for the Pila.
 
The characters go on yet another mission into the sun, this time with a laser to communicate with the sun-ghosts. They make brief contact with one of the ghosts, but an anthropomorphic ghost appears and warns them against further exploration of the sun. While they are leaving, they discover that one of Culla's dietary supplements is a dye used in tunable lasers. Combining this with an earlier conversation about Culla's eyesight, Demwa concludes that Culla can project laser light from his eyes: he has been faking the anthropomorphic ghosts. When Culla realizes he has been discovered he retreats to the instrument side of the ship and begins disabling the equipment that propels the sunship so that it will fall into the photosphere, taking all evidence of his deception with it. The sun-ghosts use toroids to arrest the ship's fall, but eventually they give out, and the ship plummets. While Demwa and one of the crew attempt to disable Culla, Helene discovers that only the galactic technology has been sabotaged, and uses the refrigerator laser as a thruster to move the ship out of the sun. Culla is killed, and the ship eventually escapes the sun, though all but Fagin temporarily "die" of hypothermia and frostbite from the refrigerator laser. The ship's records are recovered, showing that Culla used his laser sight to discredit Bubbacub, as part of a campaign to free his species from its client status, and then to sabotage the ship when he was discovered to prevent the Pila from finding out.

Although set in the same universe as the rest of the other Uplift books, it is set a considerable amount of time before the other books, and shares none of the same characters, apart from Jacob Demwa, who is mentioned as the mentor of Tom Orley and Gillian Baskin, and Helene Alvarez (née deSilva), who is mentioned in Startide Rising as Credeiki's former captain aboard the James Cook and who appears in The Uplift War to sign a treaty with the Thennanin.

Continuity
The technique used to escape the sun alive when the Galactics' technology is sabotaged, using a refrigeration laser to dump the solar heat from the ship, is used again in Heaven's Reach.

Reception
Greg Costikyan reviewed Sundiver in Ares Magazine #3 and commented that "Sundiver is thought-provoking, tightly-plotted, and readable. Though Brin's human characters are rather two-dimensional and the story depends less on their interaction and development than on the setting and science, he is somewhat more competent in this area than [author James P. Hogan on Thrice Upon a Time].  All told, it is a remarkable first effort."

Dave Langford reviewed Sundiver for White Dwarf #68, and stated that "Certain characters' weird actions are performed solely to help Brin's plot: but this is a first novel. His second won the Hugo."

Awards and nominations
Sundiver was a nominee for the 1981 Locus Award in the First Novel category.

Publication history
1980, United States, Bantam Book , Pub date 1980, Paperback
1985, United States, Spectra , Pub date 1 January  1985, Paperback
2001, United States, Recorded Books , Pub Date 2001, Cassette

Translations 

Chinese: 太阳潜入者, 2011
Bulgarian: Потапяне в Слънцето, 2001
French: Jusqu'au coeur du soleil ("To the heart of the sun"), 1980
German: Sonnentaucher ("Sun diver"), 2001
Italian: Spedizione Sundiver ("Sundiver expedition"), 1980
Polish: Słoneczny nurek ("Sun diver"), 1995
Romanian:  ("The Sun's Explorers"), 2013
Russian:  ("The Jump into the Sun"), 1995, 2002
Spanish: Navegante solar ("Solar navigator"), 1993, 1994

Notes

1980 American novels
1980 science fiction novels
American science fiction novels
Novels by David Brin
Debut science fiction novels
Novels set on Mercury (planet)
Novels set in the 23rd century
1980 debut novels
Bantam Books books